Trotec Laser is an international manufacturer of advanced laser technology for laser cutting, laser engraving and laser marking. The company was founded in 1997, branching off from a research and development department within its parent company Trodat.

Trotec is headquartered in Marchtrenk, Austria, with subsidiaries around the world in the United Kingdom, the United States, Canada, Germany, France, Netherlands, Poland, China, Japan, Russia, Australia and South Africa. The company also has an extensive network of distributors around the world serving more than 90 countries.

Laser systems 
Trotec manufactures both flatbed and galvo laser systems, as well as bespoke solutions for specialist clients. Its CO2 lasers range from 12 to 500 watts and its fiber laser systems range from 10 to 50 watts.

Trotec also supplies mechanical engraving machines, consumables and materials.

In 2008 Trotec introduced the Rayjet, a desktop laser system aimed specifically at small and medium enterprises.

References

External links 
 Trotec Laser Official Website
 CNCROi.com, company that uses Trotec Lasers in production environment

Manufacturing companies of Austria
Laser companies